Ganira Alasgar gizi Pashayeva (born 24 March 1975, in Düz Qırıqlı, Tovuz Rayon, Azerbaijan) is a Member of the National Assembly of Azerbaijan.

Early life and education
Pashayeva was born in the village of Düz Qırıqlı of Tovuz Rayon on 24 March 1975. 

She graduated from the Pediatrics Department at Azerbaijan State Medical University, and the Department of International Law at the Baku State University in Baku. She speaks Turkish, English and Russian.

Career 
Since 1998, she worked as a reporter, correspondent, editor, leading editor, senior leading editor, Deputy editor-in-chief, and Deputy editor-in-chief of the news service and Deputy editor-in-chief of the news section at the ANS Group of Companies Television Company. In 2005 she became head of public relations department of the Heydar Aliyev Foundation.

In 2012, Ganira Pashayeva worked as a pediatrician for two weeks in Somalia and helped the residents.

Political career 
On 6 November 2005, she was elected Member of Parliament from Tovuz Constituency No 105. She is a member of the Standing Commission of the National Assembly of Azerbaijan on International and Inter-Parliamentary Relations and head of the Azerbaijan-Georgia working group on interparliamentary relations. She is also a member of the Azerbaijan-India, Azerbaijan-Turkey and Azerbaijan-Japan working groups on interparliamentary relations. She is one of the members of the delegation of the Republic of Azerbaijan to the Parliamentary Assembly of the Council of Europe.

References

External links
 http://www.meclis.gov.az

1975 births
Living people
Azerbaijani journalists
Azerbaijani jurists
Azerbaijani pediatricians
Azerbaijani women physicians
Members of the National Assembly (Azerbaijan)
People from Tovuz
Azerbaijani women journalists
Women members of the National Assembly (Azerbaijan)
21st-century Azerbaijani women politicians
21st-century Azerbaijani politicians
21st-century Azerbaijani women writers
Baku State University alumni